The Gamble Place Historic District is a U.S. historic district (designated as such on September 29, 1993) located in Port Orange, Florida. The district is at 1819 Taylor Road. It contains 6 historic buildings, 5 structures, and 14 objects.

References

External links

 Volusia County listings at National Register of Historic Places

National Register of Historic Places in Volusia County, Florida
Historic districts on the National Register of Historic Places in Florida
Port Orange, Florida